Włodzimierz Trzebiatowski (February 25, 1906 in Grodzisk Wielkopolski – November 13, 1982) was a Polish chemist, physicist and mathematician. An institute in Wrocław, Poland called the Włodzimierz Trzebiatowski Institute of Low Temperature and Structure Research is named after him.

External links
Włodzimierz Trzebiatowski Institute of Low Temperature and Structure Research website

References

1906 births
1982 deaths
20th-century Polish chemists
Presidents of the Polish Academy of Sciences
20th-century Polish physicists
Recipients of the State Award Badge (Poland)